iSpace or i-Space may refer to:

 i-Space (Chinese company), a Chinese private rocket manufacturer
 ispace (Japanese company), a Japanese lunar exploration company
 I-Space (conceptual framework), a method to classify various types of knowledge
 iSpace Foundation, a technology hub in Ghana